A remote sensing software is a software application that processes remote sensing data. Remote sensing applications are similar to graphics software, but they enable generating geographic information from satellite and airborne sensor data. Remote sensing applications read specialized file formats that contain sensor image data, georeferencing information, and sensor metadata. Some of the more popular remote sensing file formats include: GeoTIFF, NITF, JPEG 2000, ECW (file format), MrSID, HDF, and NetCDF.

Remote sensing applications perform many features including:
 Change Detection — Determining the changes from images taken at different times of the same area
 Orthorectification — Warping an image to its location on the earth
 Spectral Analysis — For example, using non-visible parts of the electromagnetic spectrum to determine whether a forest is healthy
 Image Classification — Categorizing pixels based upon reflectance into different land cover classes (e.g. Supervised classification, Unsupervised classification and Object Oriented classification)

Many remote sensing applications are built using common remote sensing toolkits, like GDAL and OSSIM.

Examples of remote sensing software
 Geomatica, PCI Geomatics
 SAGA GIS (Open Source)
 TNTmips, MicroImages
 ERDAS IMAGINE
 ENVI
 Google Earth
 GRASS GIS
 OpenEV (Open Source) 
 Opticks (Open Source) 
 Orfeo toolbox (Open Source) 
 RemoteView
 SOCET SET
 IDRISI
 ECognition
 ArcGIS
 SNAP

See also
 Remote sensing
 Aerial photography
 Geographic information system (GIS)
 Radar
 Hyperspectral imaging
 Image analysis
 Multispectral imaging

Further reading